The meridian 94° east of Greenwich is a line of longitude that extends from the North Pole across the Arctic Ocean, Asia, the Indian Ocean, the Southern Ocean, and Antarctica to the South Pole.

The 94th meridian east forms a great circle with the 86th meridian west.

From Pole to Pole
Starting at the North Pole and heading south to the South Pole, the 94th meridian east passes through:

{| class="wikitable plainrowheaders"
! scope="col" width="120" | Co-ordinates
! scope="col" | Country, territory or sea
! scope="col" | Notes
|-
| style="background:#b0e0e6;" | 
! scope="row" style="background:#b0e0e6;" | Arctic Ocean
| style="background:#b0e0e6;" |
|-valign="top"
| 
! scope="row" | 
| Krasnoyarsk Krai — Komsomolets Island and October Revolution Island, Severnaya Zemlya
|-valign="top"
| style="background:#b0e0e6;" | 
! scope="row" style="background:#b0e0e6;" | Kara Sea
| style="background:#b0e0e6;" | Passing just east of Voronina Island, Krasnoyarsk Krai,  (at )
|-
| 
! scope="row" | 
| Krasnoyarsk Krai — Nordenskiöld Archipelago
|-
| style="background:#b0e0e6;" | 
! scope="row" style="background:#b0e0e6;" | Kara Sea
| style="background:#b0e0e6;" |
|-valign="top"
| 
! scope="row" | 
| Krasnoyarsk Krai Tuva Republic — from 
|-
| 
! scope="row" | 
|
|-valign="top"
| 
! scope="row" |  
| Xinjiang Gansu — from  Qinghai — from  Tibet — from 
|-valign="top"
| 
! scope="row" | 
| Arunachal Pradesh — claimed by  Assam — from  Nagaland — from Manipur — from 
|-
| 
! scope="row" |  (Burma)
|
|-valign="top"
| style="background:#b0e0e6;" | 
! scope="row" style="background:#b0e0e6;" | Indian Ocean
| style="background:#b0e0e6;" | Passing just east of Barren Island, Andaman Islands,  (at ) Passing just east of the island of Great Nicobar,  (at )
|-
| style="background:#b0e0e6;" | 
! scope="row" style="background:#b0e0e6;" | Southern Ocean
| style="background:#b0e0e6;" |
|-
| 
! scope="row" | Antarctica
| Australian Antarctic Territory, claimed by 
|-
|}

e094 meridian east